Tom Forman is a television producer who has worked as producer on 29 different shows. He is best known for creating Kid Nation and 9/11.

Awards
 Shared the Primetime Emmy Award for Outstanding Reality Program in 2005 and 2006 with others who made Extreme Makeover: Home Edition
 Shared the Emmy for Outstanding Non-Fiction Special (Informational) in 2002 for his film 9/11; he was the senior producer and senior writer.
 WGA Award Documentary – Current Events 2003

References

External links

Year of birth missing (living people)
Living people
American television producers